Patali or Pateli may refer to:
 Patali, Anbarabad
 Patali, Jiroft